The 1923–24 British Home Championship was an international football tournament played during the 1923–24 season between the British Home Nations. It was won by the excellent Welsh team of the early 1920s who achieved a whitewash of the other three home nations over the tournament, scoring five goals for just one in return.

Wales and Ireland began the competition the strongest, both beating their opponents. Ireland won 2–1 over England in Belfast, whilst Wales took Scotland 2–0 at Ninian Park. Scotland recovered in their second game with a strong display against Ireland at home whilst England slumped 2–0 against Wales in Blackburn. With Ireland needing a win at home to end level on points with the Welsh, a furious game in Belfast was eventually decided by a Moses Russell penalty in favour of the Welsh, who claimed the title. Playing for pride, England and Scotland struggled to a 1–1 draw in the final match which handed second place to the Scots.

Table

Results

Winning squad

References

1923–24 in English football
1923–24 in Scottish football
Brit
1924 in British sport
1923-24
1923 in British sport
1923–24 in Northern Ireland association football